The 2021–22 Purdue Boilermakers men's basketball team represented Purdue University in the 2021–22 NCAA Division I men's basketball season. Their head coach was Matt Painter in his 17th season with the Boilermakers. The Boilermakers played their home games at Mackey Arena in West Lafayette, Indiana as members of the Big Ten Conference.

On December 6, 2021, Purdue was ranked No. 1 in the AP poll for the first time in school history, receiving all 61 first-place votes. They were also ranked No. 1 in the Coaches poll.

Previous season
In a season limited due to the ongoing COVID-19 pandemic, the Boilermakers finished the 2020–21 season 18–10, 13–6 in Big Ten play to finish in fourth place. They lost in the quarterfinals of the Big Ten tournament to Ohio State. They received an at-large bid to the NCAA tournament as the No. 4 seed in the South region where they were upset in the First Round by No. 13-seeded North Texas.

Offseason

Departures

Recruiting classes

2021 recruiting class

2022 Recruiting class

2023 Recruiting class

Roster

Schedule and results
Purdue's game against Michigan on January 11, 2022 was postposed due to COVID-19 protocols at Michigan. The game was rescheduled for February 10.

|-
!colspan=9 style=|Exhibition

|-
!colspan=9 style=|Regular season

|-
!colspan=9 style=|Big Ten tournament

|-
!colspan=9 style=|NCAA tournament

|-

Source

Rankings

*AP does not release post-NCAA Tournament rankings^Coaches did not release a week 1 poll.

References

Purdue Boilermakers men's basketball seasons
Purdue
Purdue
Purdue
Purdue